Yavari Dayar (also Romanized as Yāvarī Dāyār; also known as Dāyār) is a village in Sanjabi Rural District, Kuzaran District, Kermanshah County, Kermanshah Province, Iran. At the 2006 census, its population was 81, in 18 families.

References 

Populated places in Kermanshah County